Chanda Rubin was the defending champion, but lost in the final to Kim Clijsters who won by 2–6, 6–2, 6–2 score.

Seeds

Draw

Finals

Top half

Bottom half

References

 Official results archive (ITF)
 Official results archive (WTA)

Hobart International